Akelius Residential Property AB (Akelius Fastigheter until spring 2014) is a listed Swedish real-estate company. Akelius is active in England, Canada, the United States and France. With a portfolio of around 18,000 apartments, it is one of the largest real estate companies in Europe. 

The main shareholder of Akelius Residential Property AB is the Akelius Foundation with 85 percent, whose founder is the Swedish founder Akelius AB, Roger Akelius. The foundation is registered as a non-profit organization in the Bahamas. The foundation is listed in the ICIJ's offshore leaks database.

The company reacted to the Berlin government's rent cap in 2020 by adding "shadow rents" on leases, some of which were five times higher than the listed rent, which were to be paid retrospectively if the law were not to endure. The rent cap was ruled unconstitutional in 2021; Akelius stated that they sought to reclaim the excess money from tenants. In response, the Berlin government provided a €10 million fund of interest-free loans to tenants struggling to make repayments.

In April 2020, the United Nations Human Rights Council accused Akelius of human rights abuses. The UN Special Rapporteur on the right to adequate housing claimed that the company practiced renovictions to circumvent rent-control regulations and left residents living in unsafe construction sites for months, sometimes without access to running water or central heating.

Die Zeit reported in a 2018 article that Akelius generated an annual rental income of approximately €500 million per year.

References 

Real estate companies of Germany
Real estate companies of Sweden
Companies based in Stockholm